Ulik is a fictional character appearing in American comic books published by Marvel Comics. He usually appears as an adversary of Thor. Ulik was created by Stan Lee and Jack Kirby, and first appears in Thor #137 (February 1967).

Debuting in the Silver Age of Comic Books, Ulik has appeared in over four decades of Marvel continuity, principally as a member of the character Thor's Rogues' Gallery. The character has also appeared in other Marvel-related products including animated television series, toys, and trading cards.

Publication history
Writer Mike Conroy commented on Ulik's debut in Thor  #137 (Feb. 1967): "In a strip as steeped in Norse mythology as Marvel's Thor, it was no surprise to come across a troll as big and mean as Ulik." Created as a physical equal for the Thunder God,  the Asgardian troll Ulik became a perennial villain for the hero.

Fictional character biography
Ulik belongs to a race of Rock Trolls who live in the dimension of Asgard in the "Domain of Trolls" in Nornheim. Like all trolls, Ulik has an innate hatred of the Asgardians, as they were driven underground by the King of the Norse gods, Odin, and forbidden to live on the surface. Ulik is commanded by the Rock Troll King, Geirrodur, to steal Thor's enchanted hammer, Mjolnir, before an attempt can be made to invade Asgard, leading to an extended series of battles with the Thunder God. Ulik proves to be a match for Thor, as the character possessing increasing strength and is equipped with knuckle dusters made of the metal uru (the same metal of which Mjolnir is composed). He nearly defeats Thor after going into the berserker state of mind, but is transported away by Geirrodur. Later on Earth, he traps Thor in his guise as Don Blake, and tries to gain the power of Thor with his cane. Blake tells him to strike it again, although Ulik says if this fails he will kill Blake, but when Ulik brings the cane down, Blake suddenly holds it, meaning that he transforms into Thor.

Ulik returns on a regular basis: battling Thor and being thrown down a deep hole before accidentally waking Odin's former foe Mangog, hoping that he can be used as an ally against Asgard after reading an inscription on the prison door by Odin; aiding Geirrodur once again; kidnapping Thor's mortal love Jane Foster; and battling Thor for possession of a mystic artifact called the Ruby Eye. The character has also travelled to Earth and battled both Thor and Olympian ally Hercules.

For a time Ulik fought on the side of several Asgardians, who were lost in their own Earthly identities. This group included the Warriors Three, Balder and Sif. He battled a version of Thor called Red Norvell and worked with his temporary allies to escape a Midgard-based technological conspiracy against lost Asgardians.

Much later, maddened and feral, Ulik is given weapons made from the same forge which created Mjolnir. He becomes the lead in Loki's attack on Asgard; this snowballs into the true Ragnarok. Ulik perishes early on in the battles. A child's hammer, made of troll-hurting iron, is thrown into his mouth by Captain America. This results in an explosion that ends his life.

However, like all of Asgard, Ulik is reformed on Earth. During the "World War Hulks" storyline, Ulik resurfaces and is shown to have gone on a multi-state drinking binge. He ends up destroying a train bridge with the disaster being averted by A-Bomb and Marlo Chandler's Harpy form. When Ulik starts choking Marlo, he is defeated by A-Bomb.

After Thor dies during the "Fear Itself" storyline, Ulik replaces him as Tanarus, the new Thunder God, endorsed by the All-Mothers of the Vanir (Freyja, Gaea, and Idunn). Exploiting a glamour charm given by Karnilla the Norn Queen and the circumstances of Thor's death, Ulik is able to retroactively place himself in Thor's place, rewriting history in the process. Only a few individuals like Karnilla and the current juvenile incarnation of Loki are aware of the deception. Tanarus' blunt nature in contrast to the honor of the true Thor allows Heimdall and Sif to realize that something is wrong relatively quickly, culminating in the returned Thor defeating "Tanarus" after his resurrection with relative ease.

Ulik later shows up as a consultant to the Minotaur of Roxxon. First, he helps Roxxon destroy Broxton, Oklahoma, right below Asgard, then he offers advice and battle against the Frost Giants of Jotunheim. This failed as the Frost Giants proceeded to take over the Roxxon facility.

As part of the "All-New, All-Different Marvel," Ulik appears as a member of the Dark Council alongside Malekith the Accursed, the Minotaur, Laufey, and some unnamed Fire Demons.

Ulik and some of his trolls later appear on the Moon where they are found and encountered by Thor Odinson. After an intense battle, Ulik and the trolls escape.

A tale told of the ancient past says how a confrontation with Ulik and trolls ultimately led to the formation of Thor's hammer, Mjolnir.

During the "War of the Realms" storyline, Ulik was present with Malekith as he begins his invasion on Midgard. She-Hulk later fights Ulik and his fellow Rock Trolls.

Powers and abilities
Ulik possesses superhuman strength, stamina and durability, and has the ability to see into the infrared range of the spectrum, allowing complete night vision. He is also a superior hand-to-hand combatant. In battle, Ulik uses "pounders", metal bands forged from uru and worn over the hands like brass knuckles.

Other versions

MC2
In the MC2 imprint title A-Next, a future alternate universe version of Ulik aids Loki's daughter Sylene in temporarily turning Earth into a new version of Asgard.

Ultimate Marvel
In the limited series The Ultimates 3, Thor talks of how Ulik forged weapons for his father, including his hammer Mjolnir. The troll appears in flashback in the prequel miniseries Ultimate Comics: Thor.

In other media

Television
 Ulik appears in The Avengers: Earth's Mightiest Heroes, voiced by Troy Baker. In the episode "The Fall of Asgard", he ambushes Eitri and the Dwarves before they can make it to their forge and ends up fighting them and Iron Man. Ulik is defeated when Iron Man dislodges the cap on the armor's chest device which knocked Ulik unconscious. Shortly after that, Eitri reattaches the cap to Iron Man's chest device to save his life.
 Ulik appears in the various animated series seen on Disney XD, voiced by Kevin Michael Richardson. 
 Ulik first appears in Avengers Assemble. In the episode "The Serpent of Doom", Ulik travels to Midgard wielding his Codgel weapon and fights Thor and the Avengers in New York. The Avengers defeat Ulik but lose the Codgel in the process, which ended up in Doctor Doom's possession. Ulik was placed in a special cell at Avengers Tower. After Doctor Doom and the Midgard Serpent are defeated, Thor visits Ulik's cell and takes him to Asgard so that Odin can deal with him. In the episode "Avengers: Impossible", Ulik is among the villains summoned to Avengers Tower by Impossible Man to spice up his own show on Falcon. Ulik ends up fighting the Hulk until Impossible Man 'scrubs the scene' by making the villains disappear. Ulik also has a minor appearance in Avengers: Ultron Revolution. In the episode "A Friend in Need", Ulik's pounders are shown to be in Asgard's custody, and that Thor mentioned that it took a quarreling Balder and Tyr to help Thor take down Ulik. He is then shown trying to break out of his prison cell, managing to break out and reclaim his pounders then fights Thor until being taken down by the Vision.
 Ulik also appears in Ultimate Spider-Man. In the two-part episode "Avenging Spider-Man", he and Fenris Wolf, along with his fellow Trolls, Frost Giants and Ice Dragons are used by Loki as part of Doctor Octopus's experiments with a mass-produced Venom symbiote. Ulik is among the possessed as one of Venom's many hosts when the creatures go on a rampage in Manhattan. When the Avengers and the S.H.I.E.L.D. Trainees separate Venom's various hosts, Ulik and the other creatures are freed one by one and sent back to Asgard. Upon Loki retreating upon defeat, it is revealed to be the same area where Ulik and the other creatures are as they prepare to get revenge on Loki.

Video games
 Ulik appears as a mini-boss in Marvel: Ultimate Alliance, voiced by Fred Tatasciore. He and Kurse steal a chest containing Volla's ring and the heroes have to fight them to get it back.
 Ulik appears in Thor: God of Thunder, voiced by Steve Blum. Loki diverts Thor to Ulik's realm as part of a plan to make himself the new hero of Asgard by defeating the powerful Mangog only for Loki to be forced to help Thor activate Frostgrinder (the Troll version of Bifrost) upon realizing that Mangog is too strong, culminating in Thor defeating Ulik to gain access to Frostgrinder.
 Ulik appears in Marvel Future Revolution as boss during the Midgardia storyline, voiced by Isaac C. Singleton Jr.

Toys
 An action figure of Ulik has been made as part of Hasbro's Marvel Legends line as of 2022.

References

External links
 
 

Comics characters introduced in 1967
Characters created by Jack Kirby
Characters created by Stan Lee
Fictional trolls
Marvel Comics characters with superhuman strength
Marvel Comics supervillains
Thor (Marvel Comics)